York County Community College (YCCC) is a public community college in Wells, Maine. YCCC is part of the Maine Community College System.

History
York County Community College was established in 1994 as York County Technical College (YCTC) by the 116th Maine Legislature. In 1995, YCTC opened with an enrollment of 156 students as well as three associate degree programs and two certificate programs.

In December 1995, YCTC earned candidacy accreditation status from the New England Association of Schools and Colleges. Full accreditation status was obtained in 1999.

In November 1997, YCTC began classes in a new building. In later years, the building was expanded.

YCTC changed its name to York County Community College in July 2003.

In October 2020, the YCCC changed its mascot to the Hawk.

Student body
In fall 2017. the enrollment was just over 1700 students ranging from ages 17–72. Undergraduates consist of 35% men and 59% women. The number of full-time students were 399 (23.4%), and the number of part-time students were 1,309 (76.6%).
 The number of degree/certificate seeking students were 1,176 (68.9%), and the number of non-degree seeking students were 532 (31.1%).

Athletics
In 2021, the school began to offer athletics, including Track and Field, Esports and other activities for students to participate in.

References

External links
Official website
Athletics website

 
Wells, Maine
Community colleges in Maine
Educational institutions established in 1994
Community College
1994 establishments in Maine